William Hough may refer to:

 William Hough (bishop) (1859–1934), Anglican bishop of Woolwich
 William Bevin Hough (1929–2019), New Zealand sportsman
 William J. Hough (1795–1869), United States Representative from New York
 William R. Hough, investment banker and benefactor of the University of Florida
 Willie Hough (1892–1976), Irish hurler
 Bill Hough, British tennis player in the 1951 Wimbledon Championships – Men's Singles
 Billy Hough, one of the founders of American theater company The Gold Dust Orphans
 Billy Hough (footballer) (1908–?), Welsh professional footballer